

Age structure 2010

Historical Data

Vital statistics

Religion

In 2010, The religious demographics of Aguascalientes were:

 Evangelical Protestant – 40,987
 Roman Catholic – 1,101,785
 Jewish – 113
 Different from Evangelical Bibles – 10,779
 Unclaimed – 21,235
 Others – 722
 Unspecified – 9,375

See also
 Mexico
 States of Mexico
 Geography of Mexico
 List of Mexican states by area
 Ranked list of Mexican states
 List of Mexican states by HDI

References

Template

Aguascalientes